Adrien Achille Proust (18 March 1834 – 26 November 1903) was a French epidemiologist and hygienist. He was the father of novelist Marcel Proust and doctor Robert Proust.

He studied medicine in Paris, where in 1862 he obtained his medical doctorate. Beginning in 1863 he worked as chef de clinique, and in 1866 earned his agrégation with the thesis Des différentes formes de ramollissement du cerveau (On different forms of softening of the brain). In 1869 he was sent on a mission to Russia and Persia in order to conduct cholera research – a journey in which he also visited Athens, Constantinople, Messina and several locations in Germany.

He was a professor of hygiene at the faculty of medicine in Paris, and chief physician at the Hôtel-Dieu de Paris. He was a member of the Comité d'Hygiène publique de France and of the Académie de médecine (from 1879), serving as its secretary from 1883 to 1888.

In 1888, Adrien Proust, believing like many doctors of his day that masturbation may lead to homosexuality, sent his son Marcel to a brothel with 10 francs. Marcel would relate the awkward experience of what occurred there in a letter to his grandfather.

Adrien Proust is mentioned in Love in the Time of Cholera, a 1985 novel by Gabriel García Márquez.

Published works 
With neurologist Gilbert Ballet he was the author of an important book on neurasthenia, titled L'hygiène du neurasthénique (1900). It was later translated into English and published as "The treatment of neurasthenia" (1903). Among his other written efforts are the following:
 Traité d'hygiène publique et privée, 1877 – Treatise of public and private hygiene.
 La défense de l'Europe contre le choléra, 1892 – Defense of Europe against cholera
 La défense de l'Europe contre la peste, 1897 – Defense of Europe against bubonic plague.

References 

1834 births
1903 deaths
People from Eure-et-Loir
Academic staff of the University of Paris
French pathologists
Hygienists
Marcel Proust